The Department of Science and Consumer Affairs was an Australian government department that existed between June and December 1975.

Scope
Information about the department's functions and/or government funding allocation could be found in the Administrative Arrangements Orders, the annual Portfolio Budget Statements and in the department's annual reports.

At its creation, the department's functions were:
Science and technology, including research, support of research and support of civil space research programs
Meteorology
Ionospheric prediction service
Analytical laboratory service
Patents of inventions and designs, and trade marks
Weights and measure
National standards
Consumer affairs

Structure
The department was a Commonwealth Public Service department, staffed by officials who were responsible to the Minister for Science and Consumer Affairs.

References

Ministries established in 1975
Science and Consumer Affairs